Dikhawa is a Pakistani anthology series that premiered on 25 April 2020, on Geo Entertainment. It was created by Abdullah Kadwani and Asad Qureshi under 7th Sky Entertainment. The spin-off to the anthology series Makafaat, it features different short episodic stories focusing on religious and social repercussions of showing off, pretentiousness, and posturing.

List of episodes

Season 1

Season 2

Season 3

Cast 
Neelam Muneer as Nimmi 
Azra Mohyeddin as Afaq's mother
Ali Ansari as Hasham 
Nawal Saeed as Saira
Mehmood Aslam as Nimmi's father 
Hina Javed as Ishwar
Saba Faisal as Nimmi's mother 
Hammad Farooqui as Faisal
Beena Chaudhary as Saira's neighbor	
Faraz Farooqui as Sajid
Sadaf Aashan as Sadia
Hina Altaf as Maira
Arez Ahmed as Zaid
Amna Malik as Tabinda
Omer Shahzad as Adeel 
Saima Qureshi as Ifrah
Savera Nadeem as Maira's mother 
Sumaiyya Bukhsh as Wareesha
Fazila Kaiser as Shaista
Kinza Malik as Salma
Shahood Alvi as Nadeem
Anumta Qureshi as Rubina 
Sami Khan as Umair Nadeem 
Farah Nadir as Nargis
Mashal Khan as Huma 
Ayesha Gul as Zakia 
Fatima Effendi as Saba 
Nida Mumtaz as Saira's mother 
Fareeda Shabbir as Sabiqa's mother
Erum Akhtar as Tabassum
Sehar Khan as Saba
Usama Khan as Waqar
Madiha Rizvi as Samira
Jinaan Hussain as Pari
Fahima Awan as Sara
Adla Khan as Malika
Saba Hameed as Mrs. Kamran 
Annie Zaidi as Bismah's mother
Sabahat Ali Bukhari as Ruqayya
Anum Fayyaz as Nirma
Munazzah Arif as Shagufta
Mohsin Abbas Haider as Kamran
Saniya Shamshad as Asfa Nasir
Irfan Motiwala as Nadeem's brother
Raeed Muhammad Alam as Raheel
Usman Peerzada as Akmal
Madiha Imam as Zara
Farhan Ali Agha as Basim
Maria Wasti 
Seemi Pasha as Fakhra's mother
Ayaz Samoo 
Syed Jibran 
Shameen Khan as Aliya
Saife Hassan 
Noman Habib 
Ali Abbas
Maryam Fatima as Maria
Arisha Razi as Soleha
Zuhab Khan 
Mizna Waqas 
Agha Ali as Momin
Ushna Shah 
Zainab Qayyum as Maria's mother
Haris Waheed as Jahangir
Gul-e-Rana as Gul-e-Rana
Alizeh Shah as Misbah
Noaman Sami as Afaq
Mizna Waqas

Broadcast
The first season aired in 2020, airing episodes at noontime on Geo Entertainment.

The second season aired in 2021,  airing daily half-hour episodes at 5:00 PM on Geo Entertainment. The season aired daily till the end of Ramadan. The second season also had a re-run shortly after its end on the same channel in July. The first and second season aired on Geo Kahani in December 2021 and January 2022, respectively.

The third season premiered in April 2022 airing episodes daily in the afternoon on Geo Entertainment. The season consisted of 30 episodes in total. However, 6 episodes (Zid, Hirs, Maseeha, Moqa Parast, Eid Ki Khushiyan, and Jhoot) from previous seasons were also aired along with the 24 original episodes. The season ended on 2 May 2022.

References

External links 
Official website

2020 Pakistani television series debuts
Pakistani drama television series
Urdu-language television shows
Pakistani anthology television series
Ramadan special television shows